The Puppet Man is a 1921 British silent drama film directed by Frank Hall Crane and starring Hugh Miller, Molly Adair and Hilda Anthony.

Cast
 Hugh Miller as 	Alcide le Beau
 Molly Adair as Jenny Rose
 Hilda Anthony as Lilla Lotti
 Mane Belocci as Little Bimbo
 Harry Paulo as Joe
 Leo Fisher as Bimbo
 Johnny Reid as Bobby

References

Bibliography
 Low, Rachael. The History of British Film, Volume 4 1918-1929. Routledge, 1997.

External links
 

1921 films
British drama films
British silent feature films
Films directed by Frank Hall Crane
1921 drama films
Films based on British novels
British black-and-white films
1920s English-language films
1920s British films
Silent drama films